Cancer and Genetics Research Complex at the University of Florida is an interdisciplinary research center. The goal of this facility is to harness the faculty & researchers from varying departments at the University of Florida to make exciting new discoveries, and to transfer technology to the marketplace. The Complex also houses the UF Genetics Institute (UFGI), the UF Health Cancer Center, the UF Interdisciplinary Center for Biotechnology Research, and the C.A. Pound Human Identification Laboratory, an internationally known laboratory for research and consulting in forensic anthropology.

History 
The Complex began construction in 2002 and cost an estimated $85 million. In November 2006, Governor Jeb Bush officially opened the facility. Overall 77 million pounds of concrete were used, and the facility is 280,000 square feet.

Mission 
The Complex was created to increase collaborations among many groups of researchers and to convert scientific breakthroughs into innovative cancer therapies, basic research, agriculture and other beneficial technologies applied to life science.

Images

See also
University of Florida
Buildings at the University of Florida
C.A. Pound Human Identification Laboratory

References

External links 
UF Genetics Institute website
Interdisciplinary Center for Biotechnology Research

University of Florida
Medical research institutes in Florida
2006 establishments in Florida